Michael McCarthy is Director of Music at Washington National Cathedral. Previously, he was the founding director of the London Oratory School Schola at the London Oratory in London. In addition to liturgical duties, the Schola recorded for the film scores of Sleepy Hollow, The Lord of the Rings film trilogy, and the Harry Potter series. McCarthy also worked with The Sixteen, the Gabrieli Consort, The Cardinall's Musick and the Monteverdi Choir.

As a composer/arranger, his music was featured at the funerals of Presidents Ronald Reagan, Gerald R. Ford, and George H. W. Bush, and the service for the second inauguration of George W. Bush, all events held at Washington National Cathedral. The Cathedral choirs have also recorded some of his music, such as "O Love of God" and "Lord of the Dance" on the CD entitled, "America the Beautiful" (2005).

Positions held
Director of Music at Washington National Cathedral, Washington, DC
Conductor of the Cathedral Choirs of Men, Boys, and Girls
Director of the London Oratory School Schola Cantorum
Choirmaster of St Georges RC Church Choir, Sudbury, Middlesex.

References

External links
Website with Bio

British composers
British male conductors (music)
Year of birth missing (living people)
Living people
21st-century British conductors (music)
21st-century British male musicians